Amy Menke is an American professional ice hockey forward, currently playing with the Minnesota section of the PWHPA. She has previously won both the Isobel Cup and the ZhHL championship.

Career 
Across 146 NCAA games, Menke scored 108 points, serving as the University of North Dakota team captain in her senior year. Just weeks after her graduation, the university controversially announced that it was cutting its women's hockey programme. She wrote an article in The Players' Tribune in response, stating that "Our program was a big family, and it died that day."

She was drafted 17th overall by the Metropolitan Riveters in the 2016 NWHL Draft. She joined the independent Minnesota Whitecaps ahead of the 2017–18 season. She would spend part of the season in Sweden, joining Djurgårdens IF in the SDHL for their playoff push.

She stayed with the Whitecaps as the team joined the NWHL, scoring 10 points in 15 games in 2018–19. She would score in the championship games as the Whitecaps won the Isobel Cup for the first time.

After the collapse of the CWHL in May 2019, she joined the over 200 players taking part in the ForTheGame movement, which later led to the creation of the PWHPA, sitting out from North American women's hockey leagues with the goal securing better investment and conditions for the sport. In August 2019, she signed with China-based Shenzhen KRS Vanke Rays, who had decided to switch to the ZhHL from the CWHL. She scored 17 points in 24 games for the club in 2019-20 as they won the Russian championship.

She was named to the roster for the Minnesota hub of the PWHPA ahead of the 2020–21 season.

Personal life 
Outside of hockey, Menke has worked. She has previously served as head coach for the Shakopee High School girls' hockey team.

References

External links

1995 births
Living people
Professional Women's Hockey Players Association players
Minnesota Whitecaps players
Shenzhen KRS Vanke Rays players
Djurgårdens IF Hockey players